Danny Thomas (born 22 November 1999) is an American tennis player.

Thomas has a career high ATP singles ranking of 724 achieved on 16 April 2018. He also has a career high ATP doubles ranking of 488 achieved on 16 July 2018.

Thomas made his Grand Slam main draw debut at the 2017 US Open after receiving a wild card for winning the under-18 boys championship with Vasil Kirkov.

External links

1999 births
Living people
American male tennis players